C.S.P.S. Hall may refer to:

C.S.P.S. Hall (Cedar Rapids, Iowa)
C.S.P.S. Hall (Saint Paul, Minnesota)